There are a number of large swimming pools around the world, several of which are artificial lagoons. As of 2019, the Guinness World Record holder for the largest man-made lagoon is Citystars Sharm El Sheikh, located in Sharm El Sheikh, Egypt.

List
Depth and volume are not taken into account. Note that this list may not be comprehensive as large swimming pools for which no reliable sources exist attesting to their size are not included.

Note: Marketing material and press releases for Citystars Sharm El Sheikh claim a larger area of

Other swimming pool superlatives

References

Swimming pools
Swimming pools
Lists of swimming pools
Swimming pools